These are the official results of the 2014 Mediterranean Athletics U23 Championships which took place on 14–15 June 2014 in Aubagne, France.

Men's results

100 metres
Heats Wind: Heat 1: +3.0 m/s / Heat 2: +2.8 m/s

FinalWind: +1.7 m/s

200 metres
Heats Wind: Heat 1: +2.1 m/s / Heat 2: +2.9 m/s

FinalWind: +0.2 m/s

400 metres
Heats 

Final

800 metres

1500 metres

5000 metres

10000 metres

110 metres hurdles
Wind: +0.2 m/s

400 metre hurdles

3000 metre steeplechase

10,000 metres walk

4x100 m relay

4x400 m relay

High jump

Pole vault

Long jump

Triple jump

Shot put

Discus throw

Hammer throw

Javelin throw

Women's results

100 meters

200 meters

400 meters

800 metres

1500 metres

10.000 metres

100 metres hurdles

400 metres hurdles

3000 metres steeplechase

10.000 metres race walk

4x100 m relay

4x400 m relay

High jump

Pole vault

Long jump

Triple jump

Shot put

Discus throw

Hammer throw

Javelin throw

References

Mediterranean U23
Events at the Mediterranean Athletics U23 Championships